Vinnie Vincent Invasion is the first studio album by Vinnie Vincent Invasion, released in 1986 through Chrysalis Records.

Background
Two singles were released, "Boyz Are Gonna Rock" and "Back on the Streets". A music video was only made for "Boyz Are Gonna Rock". In the video for "Boyz Are Gonna Rock," the singer in the video is Mark Slaughter rather than the actual singer Robert Fleischman. Fleischman left the band prior to filming the video and Mark Slaughter lip-synched to Fleischman's vocals.

"Back on the Streets" was originally written by Vincent with musician Richie Friedman in 1981, demoed but not used for the Creatures of the Night album and recorded by 3 Speed for the 1984 movie Voyage of the Rock Aliens. It was later covered by Europe's original guitarist John Norum for his 1987 solo album Total Control.  This song was also played by Ace Frehley during his earliest shows with his post-Kiss band Frehley's Comet in 1985 and also demoed by his band as well during this time, but the song has never appeared on any of Ace Frehley's solo albums.

For the CD and cassette versions, the song "Invasion"  contained about three minutes of looping guitar feedback at the end of the song. The record version had the same feedback, but the difference was that it never ended until you picked up the needle. This was because the sound went all the way to the end of the vinyl, causing the needle to loop it over and over again. The liner notes state that no pedals, outboard gear or synthesizers were used anywhere on the album.

The band opened for Alice Cooper in 1986 and Iron Maiden in 1987 to support the record. The song "Animal" appeared on the soundtrack for the 1987 movie Summer School.

The songs "Boyz Are Gonna Rock" and "Back on the Streets" are 2 of 4 Vinnie Vincent Invasion songs featured on the 2008 tribute album KISS MY ANKH: A Tribute to Vinnie Vincent. Mike Weeks played the guitar, bass and did the vocals on a very accurate version of "Boys Are Gonna Rock" which also featured drums by Andre Labelle, who had previously recorded drums on Vinnie's third (and unreleased) album "Guitarmaggedon/Guitars from Hell".

Reception

The album was listed number 8 on Kerrang!s list of hard rock albums in 1986. The same magazine listed the album number 100 on their list of 100 Greatest Heavy Metal Albums of All Time. In the book Fargo Rock City, journalist Chuck Klosterman names it the second greatest heavy metal album of the 1980s, behind only Appetite For Destruction by Guns N' Roses. Rolling Stone listed it 39th on their 2015 list of Greatest Hair Metal albums of all time.

Track listing

Personnel 
 Robert Fleischman - vocals
 Vinnie Vincent - guitars, vocals
 Dana Strum - bass, backing vocals
 Bobby Rock - drums

References

Vinnie Vincent Invasion albums
1986 debut albums
Chrysalis Records albums